Ghost of Zorro is a 1949 Republic Movie serial. It uses substantial stock footage from earlier serials, including Son of Zorro and Daredevils of the West. This film was shot in Chatsworth, Los Angeles.

Plot
The year is 1865 and the telegraph is heading west. George Crane, wanting to keep law and order out of his territory, is out to stop the construction. One of the main engineers on the job is Ken Mason, the grandson of the original Zorro. As Crane hires his men to stop the work, Mason finds himself in the legendary role his ancestor originated.

Cast
Clayton Moore as Ken Mason/Zorro
Pamela Blake as Rita White
Roy Barcroft as Hank Kilgore
George J. Lewis as Moccasin
Eugene Roth as George Crane

Production
Ghost of Zorro was budgeted at $165,086 although the final negative cost was $164,895 (a $191, or 0.1 percent, under-spend).

It was filmed between January 11 and February 2, 1949. The serial's production number was 1702.

Stunts
Tom Steele as Ken Mason/Zorro (doubling Clayton Moore)

Special Effects
Special effects by the Lydecker brothers.

Release

Theatrical
Ghost of Zorro'''s official release date is March 24, 1949, although this is actually the date the sixth chapter was made available to film exchanges.

A 69-minute feature film version, created by editing the serial footage together, was released on June 30, 1959. It was one of fourteen feature films Republic made from their serials.

Chapter titles

166 minutes = 2h, 45m, 12s

Bandit Territory (19min 56s)
Forged Orders (13min 13s)
Robber's Agent (13min 09s)
Victims of Vengeance (13min 07s)
Gun Trap (13min 11s)
Deadline at Midnight (13min 18s)
Tower of Disaster (13min 14s)
Mob Justice (13min 18s)
Money Lure (13min 15s)
Message of Death (12min 39s) - a re-cap chapter
Runaway Stagecoach (13min 48s)
Trail of Blood (12min 59s)
Source:

See also
List of film serials by year
List of film serials by studio
Earlier Republic Zorro serials:-Zorro Rides Again (1937)Zorro's Fighting Legion (1939)Zorro's Black Whip (1944)Son of Zorro'' (1947)

References

External links

1949 films
1949 Western (genre) films
1940s English-language films
American black-and-white films
Republic Pictures film serials
Zorro films
Films set in 1865
Films directed by Fred C. Brannon
American Western (genre) films
Films based on works by Johnston McCulley
1940s American films